Amphidromus areolatus is a species of air-breathing land snail, a terrestrial pulmonate gastropod mollusk in the family Camaenidae.

Distribution
Distribution of Amphidromus areolatus include Attapeu Province and Champasak Province in southern Laos.

Description

Ecology
Amphidromus areolatus lives in dry dipterocarp forests.

References

External links 

areolatus
Gastropods described in 1861